The Château de Trémazan is a ruined castle in the commune of Landunvez in the Finistère département of France. It is located below the coastal road, hidden from the sea.

Architecture
This beautiful medieval building, constructed on a rocky outcrop, has a square keep which, following a partial collapse during the winter of 1995, exposed the interior to reveal a habitable tower of four floors, each with one chamber.

History
The history of Trémazan is intimately linked to that of the du Chastel (or Châtel) family. It was they who built it and made it their principal residence for several centuries. The origins of this dynasty are still shrouded in mist, but with the passage of history, they became very prominent. So much so that Chastels ended up taking their place in the high Breton aristocracy and being counted among the four most important families of the Viscounty of Léon. An old saying characterises Léon in these terms: "antiquité de Penhoët, vaillance du Chastel, richesse de Kermavan et chevalerie de Kergounadeac'h" (the antiquity of Penhoët, the bravery of Chastel, the wealth of Kermavan and the chivalry of Kergounadeac'h). However, by the end of the 16th century, the elder branch of the family died out for lack of a male heir.

The present castle goes back mainly to the 13th and 14th centuries. The castle would have been built on the ruins of a castellum already existing in the 6th century. According to legend, Tanneguy du Chastel, founder of the abbey at Saint-Mathieu, was born here. The building became a stone castle around the 10th century. In 1220, it was destroyed during the war against the Duke of Brittany, then rebuilt thirty years later by Bernard du Châtel. Sold as national property after the French Revolution, the castle was abandoned in the 18th century. Apart from the 12th century square keep, remains include towers and the outer enceinte dating from the 13th, 14th and 15th centuries.

Preservation attempts: SOS Château de Trémazan
Today, the non-profit association S.O.S Château de Trémazan attempts to preserve the castle and to increase the knowledge of its past. Thus, samples of the castle beams gave rise to a study of dendrochronology for better dating of the building.

Until funds are found for its restoration, the association SOS Château de Trémazan has attempted to finance the establishment of a temporary protection against potential structural collapses.

It has been listed since 1926 as a monument historique by the French Ministry of Culture.

See also
 List of castles in France
 Tour Tanguy
In French Wikipedia
 Famous member of the family: Tanneguy du Chastel

References

External links

 Official site of the SOS association 
 Casteland

Sources
 tremazan.lepla.com

Trémazan
Ruined castles in Brittany
Monuments historiques of Finistère